Tequila Sunrise is a 1988 American romantic crime film written and directed by Robert Towne. It stars Mel Gibson, Michelle Pfeiffer, and Kurt Russell, with Raul Julia, J. T. Walsh, Arliss Howard, and Gabriel Damon in supporting roles. The original music score was composed by Dave Grusin.

The film was the second (after Personal Best) to be both written and directed by Academy Award-winning screenwriter Towne, was commercially successful, grossing over $100 million at the box office worldwide, but critical reception was mixed. One reviewer was of the opinion that, "perhaps because the elements were so irresistible—Robert Towne directing Gibson, Russell and Pfeiffer in a California crime film—an aura of disappointment settled over Tequila Sunrise, no matter how engaging, and profitable, it turned out to be."

Tequila Sunrise was nominated for an Academy Award for Best Cinematography. The film's soundtrack spawned the single "Surrender to Me", performed by Ann Wilson (lead singer of Heart) and Robin Zander (lead singer of Cheap Trick), reaching number 6 on the Billboard Hot 100 in early 1989.

Plot

Dale "Mac" McKussic is a former drug dealer trying to go straight. His close friend Nick Frescia is a Detective Lieutenant with the Los Angeles County Sheriff's Department who, in spite of their long-term relationship going back to high school, is duty-bound to bring Mac to justice if he is selling drugs again, as DEA Agent Hal Maguire believes to be the case.

Mac is attracted to stylish restaurant owner Jo Ann Vallenari. Nick becomes acquainted with her while attempting to learn more about Mac's activities, in particular his relationship with the Mexican drug kingpin Carlos, whom the DEA agents and Mexican federal police commandante' Escalante believe is coming to town. Mac has a legitimate business and is raising a son, trying to distance himself from his former drug smuggling ways. But he tries to help his lawyer sell some cocaine, and feels indebted to his old friend Carlos, who is pressuring him to do one last job.

Jo Ann succumbs to Nick's charms and a love affair begins. He genuinely cares for her, but she becomes angry when Mac accuses her of spying on him for Nick. During a meeting at Jo Ann's restaurant with Maguire and Escalante to discuss Mac and Carlos, Escalante gives Nick a ceremonial pistol as a gesture of good faith. Jo Ann then accuses Nick of using her to gather information on Mac because he often eats at her restaurant, and hired her to cater his son's birthday party. 

Nick admits he is investigating Mac and that he originally approached her because of that. But he truthfully admits that he really has fallen in love with her. Jo Ann ends her relationship with Nick for his initial deception after catching him trying to listen in on a private telephone conversation. Meanwhile, Maguire and his associates set a trap for Mac and the mysterious Carlos, whose face none of them, except Mac, has ever seen.

In time, Jo Ann realizes that Mac is in love with her and that she has fallen for him. Nick figures out that Mac's cousin Gregg is an informer for the DEA. He also realizes that Maguire has become dangerously obsessed with catching Mac, willing to use any means necessary. Mac and Jo Ann make love at his house. 

Jo Ann is called to her restaurant on business. Nick meets her there, gives her a pistol (the same ceremonial pistol he was given by Escalante) for protection, and tells her to stay in her restaurant until a deputy sheriff arrives to guard her, because Carlos is expected to arrive at Mac's home later that night. She does not heed Nick's warning and returns to Mac's house, where she discovers that Escalante is, in fact, Carlos.

Carlos relieves her of Nick's pistol, recognizing it, and then takes her to his yacht at the marina. He knows that Gregg is the informer and has him killed, leaving his body next to a shipment of gasoline contaminated cocaine. Maguire and Nick find Gregg's body and the cocaine at the beach. Nick meets with Mac to warn him that Jo Ann is in danger. 

Mac pulls a gun on Nick and rushes to the marina. Carlos pressures him to kill Jo Ann because she now knows too much. He refuses, threatens Carlos at gunpoint and gets Jo Ann to safety on a speedboat. Mac nevertheless promises him that he will be at the rendezvous site as arranged to conclude their business. 

Nick explains to Maguire that Escalante is actually Carlos and heads for the marina. Mac arrives first and is double-crossed by Carlos, whereupon a fight ensues between them. As they struggle over the pistol, it fatally discharges into Carlos's abdomen, wounding Mac in the process. Carlos dies in Mac's arms.

Maguire shows up and begins shooting, hitting an already dead Carlos in the face, and then at Mac as he is raising his hands to surrender. The gunfire causes the boat's fuel tank to catch fire, just as Mac jumps in the water. Nick arrives at the marina. Hearing the gunfire, he draws his weapon and orders Maguire to cease fire. He continues shooting, forcing Nick to shoot him in the back, killing him. The fire causes the boat to explode, and with it the millions of dollars on board.

The film ends with Nick asking Jo Ann to meet him at the beach. She arrives to instead find Mac, and runs to embrace him in the waves. A pleased Nick watches from a distance.

Cast

Production

Filming
Tequila Sunrise was filmed on location at Manhattan Beach, California.

Before filming commenced, actors attached to the lead male roles included Harrison Ford, Alec Baldwin, Nick Nolte, and Jeff Bridges.

The expensive menswear and slicked-back hair sported by Kurt Russell's character, Detective Lieutenant Nick Frescia, was modelled upon Pat Riley. Russell was quoted as saying that "Riley's look was right for this film because he was arrogantly confident but not offensive."

The famous love scene between Mel Gibson and Michelle Pfeiffer takes place in a hot tub, that was reportedly not properly constructed or chlorinated, resulting in skin rashes and splinters for the actors and their body doubles, and causing production to halt for a few days.

Director Robert Towne wanted Dale McKussic (Gibson) to go up in smoke at the end of the film, but one of the conditions Warner Bros. set was that he must live. "Gibson's character was supposed to be a moth in the flame", said Towne. "The real high for him was never doing the drugs, but the danger of dealing the drugs."

Reception

Critical response
Tequila Sunrise holds a score of 50% on Rotten Tomatoes based on 32 reviews, and a score of 62 on Metacritic, indicating mixed reviews. It was a commercial success, grossing over $105 million worldwide against a production budget of $20 million.

Critics commented both positively and negatively upon the labyrinthine nature of the complex plot, characteristic of earlier Robert Towne screenplays such as Chinatown. Roger Ebert of the Chicago Sun-Times wrote that "Tequila Sunrise weaves a tangled web, and there are times when we are not sure what is happening, or why. There are even moments when the chronology itself seems confused, when characters seem to know things they could not be aware of, when other characters arrive at places they should not have known about." Vincent Canby of The New York Times called it "the fuzzy focus of someone who has stared too long at a light bulb. Narrative points aren't made and the wrong points are emphasized." However, Time Out wrote that the "set-up has the precision of fine needlepoint, picking out the plot outline before embroidering it with a complex pattern of interwoven relationships."

Pfeiffer was described as a "stunning presence" by The New York Times, while Time Out thought her "perfect as the immaculately dressed and icily controlled restaurateur caught between Gibson's honest (ex-)criminal and Russell's ambiguously motivated cop." Variety praised each of the lead performances—"Gibson projects control skating atop paranoia, and is appealing as a man you'd want to trust. Russell is fine as the slick cop who's confused by his own shifting values, and Pfeiffer achieves a rather touching quality with her gun-shy girl beneath the polished professional"—but concluded there was "not much kick in this cocktail, despite its mix of quality ingredients."

Accolades
Conrad Hall was nominated for an Academy Award for Best Cinematography, and won an American Society of Cinematographers Award for Outstanding Achievement in Cinematography in Theatrical Releases.

Gabriel Damon was nominated for a Young Artist Award in the category of Best Young Actor Supporting Role in a Motion Picture.

References

External links 
 
 
 
 
 Movie stills

1980s English-language films
1988 crime films
1988 films
1988 romance films
American crime films
American romance films
Films about cocaine
Films about Mexican drug cartels
Films about the illegal drug trade
Films directed by Robert Towne
Films scored by Dave Grusin
Films with screenplays by Robert Towne
Manhattan Beach, California
Romantic crime films
1980s American films